O. tricolor may refer to:
 Octomeria tricolor, an orchid species endemic to southeastern Brazil
 Oliva tricolor, a sea snail species
 Onchidium tricolor, an air-breathing sea slug species
 Oxyothespis tricolor, a praying mantis species

See also
 Tricolor (disambiguation)